Michael Lee Wesch (born June 22, 1975) is Professor of Cultural Anthropology and a University Distinguished Teaching Scholar at Kansas State University. Wesch's work also includes media ecology and the emerging field of digital ethnography, where he studies the effect of new media on human interaction.

Wesch is a cultural anthropologist and media ecologist exploring the effects of new media on human interaction. He graduated summa cum laude from the Kansas State University Anthropology Program in 1997 and returned as a faculty member in 2004 after receiving his PhD in Anthropology at the University of Virginia. There he pursued research on social and cultural change in Melanesia, focusing on the introduction of print and print-based practices like mapping and census-taking in the remote Mountain Ok region of Papua New Guinea where he lived for a total of 18 months from 1999-2003. This work inspired Wesch to examine the effects of new media more broadly, especially digital media. Also as a consequence of this trip, Dr. Wesch has gained some command of the Tok Pisin language, a primary lingua franca of Papua New Guinea.

Wesch launched the Digital Ethnography Working Group, a team of undergraduates at Kansas State University exploring human uses of digital technology. Coinciding with the launch of this group, Wesch created a short video, "Web 2.0 The Machine is Us/ing Us." Released on YouTube on January 31, 2007. In June 2008 Wesch presented An Anthropological Introduction to YouTube to the US Library of Congress. Wesch drew on the work of his students to present unique ideas and discoveries about the social impact of YouTube and socially networked media generally.

Wesch has won several awards for his work with video, including a Wired Magazine Rave Award and the John Culkin Award for Outstanding Media Praxis from the Media Ecology Association.

Wesch's videos are part of his broader efforts to pursue the possibilities of digital media to extend and transform the way ethnographies are presented. Wesch is also a multiple award-winning teacher, active in the development of innovative teaching techniques. Most notably, Wesch has developed a highly acclaimed "World Simulation" for large introductory classes in cultural anthropology. On 20 November 2008, CASE and the Carnegie Foundation for the Advancement of Teaching honored Wesch as Professor of the Year.

Currently he is the coordinator for the Peer Review of Teaching Project at Kansas State University, part of a broader nationwide consortium of universities pursuing new ways to improve and evaluate student learning. He is also working with the Educause Center for Applied Research on "The Tower and the Cloud" project, examining "the question of how higher education institutions (The Tower) may interoperate with the emerging network-based business and social paradigm (The Cloud)."

See also
 Context collapse

Further reading

References

External links
Official Page with Bio, Videos, Presentations, News, and Other Materials

Cultural anthropologists
Living people
1975 births
People from Fairbury, Nebraska
Kansas State University alumni
University of Virginia alumni
Kansas State University faculty